Octynes are alkynes with one triple bond and the molecular formula C8H14.

The isomers are:
 1-Octyne
 2-Octyne
 3-Octyne
 4-Octyne

Alkynes